Así son ellas (English: So are those) is a Mexican telenovela produced by Raúl Araiza for Televisa in 2002.

On Monday, September 23, 2002, Canal de las Estrellas started broadcasting Así son ellas weekdays at 8:00pm, replacing La Otra. The last episode was broadcast on Friday, January 24, 2003 with Niña Amada Mía replacing it on Monday, January 27, 2003.

Erika Buenfil, Lourdes Munguía, Luz María Jerez, Leticia Perdigón and Gabriela Goldsmith starred as protagonists, while Maite Embil starred as main antagonist.

Plot 
Dalia, Rosa, Narda, Margarita and Violeta have been friends in good times and in bad, when they were teens they formed a club called "The Club of the Flowers" because each were named after a flower. The five dreamed of the future, they thought they would marry, have a nice family and of course, would remain as good friends as when they formed the club.

Violeta Carmona: is the one who triggered this story and involuntarily cause "The Club of the Flowers" to meet again.

Margarita Saavedra: had a great love of youth. As a teenager she was in love with a handsome boy named Ricardo. He also corresponded fully to her but Ricardo was from a very humble class.

Dalia Marcelín: is an infinitely different woman from Margarita. Dalia was the typical class applied girl, who always appeared in the honor roll for her excellent grades.

Rosa Corso: only member of the "Club of the Flowers" that continues married and happy, is at least what she believes. She met Armando when both attended high school.

Narda Maria: the most liberal and the most fun of all. Narda has two divorces that have provided good dividends, thanks to her friend Dalia, who is her lawyer.

Irene Molet: the only one who is not named after a flower, majored in Social Work, has a great sense of kindness, generosity and dedication to service.

Cast 
 
Erika Buenfil as Dalia Marcelín Gutiérrez
Lourdes Munguía as Irene Molet de Villaseñor
Leticia Perdigón as Margarita Saavedra Cañada
Luz María Jerez as Rosa Corso Rivas de Calderón
Gabriela Goldsmith as Narda Mareca Amaya
Cecilia Gabriela as Violeta Carmona Heredia
Maite Embil as Florencia Linares Escudero
Alexis Ayala as Diego Montejo
Armando Araiza as Narciso Villaseñor
Orlando Carrió as Armando Calderón
Eduardo Liñán as Fernando Villaseñor
Jorge Antolín as Julio Bolestáin
Alejandra Meyer as Brígida Corcuera
Carmelita González as Aunt Luvia
Rosita Quintana as Carmina del Mar Vda. de Mareca
Benito Castro as Roque Delfino
Alfonso Iturralde as Alejandro
Lorenzo de Rodas as Don Ramiro Sepúlveda
Gerardo Quiroz as Raymundo Villaseñor
Leonorilda Ochoa as Rita Díaz
Luis Reynoso as Ricardo Olvera
Ariane Pellicer as Elena Molet
Joemy Blanco as Cecilia Calderón
Andrés Puentes as Cristián Madrigal
Susy-Lu Peña as Mercedes Sepúlveda
Luis Mario Quiroz as Armando Calderón Jr.
Germán Gutiérrez as Patricio Bolestáin
Franco Gala as Roberto "Tito" Fernández
César Évora as Luis Ávila
Kelchie Arizmendi as Violeta (young)
Estephanie de la Cruz as Dalia (young)
Consuelo Mendiola as Irene (young)
Gabriela Ferreira as Margarita (young)
Silvia Beguerisse as Rosa (young)
Silvia Ramírez as Narda (young)
Silvia Eugenia Derbez as Carmina (young)
Patricia Martínez as Caridad
Humberto Herrera as Román
Mónica Dossetti as Ivette Molina
Hanny Sáenz as Estela
Jaime Lozano as Sergio Salomón
María Fernanda Rodríguez as ' Carmelita SepúlvedaJuan Ignacio Aranda as CarlosArsenio Campos as Mariano MadrigalJaime Herner as Osvaldo CarpioBelén Balmori as Annel PaulínDaniel Gauvry as Néstor ElorzaGinny Hoffman as RocíoSara Monar as Beatriz de CarmonaYolanda Ciani as MarinaRosángela Balbó as MarthaRicardo Silva as AgustínClaudia Cervantes as CleoZully Moreno as Eliana SantosShirley as BelindaCésar Castro as SamuelEleazar Gómez as Arturo CalderónSergio Jiménez as Theater's directorMariana Karr as EmiliaIsabel Martínez "La Tarabilla" as NicandraMaría Dolores Oliva as TránsitoRafael Origel as SupermanAdalberto Parra as Dr. CastroManuel Sánchez as KalimanEvelyn Solares as TilaLuis Xavier as JorgeRocío Yaber as Amparo''

References

External links

 at esmas.com 

2002 telenovelas
Mexican telenovelas
2002 Mexican television series debuts
2003 Mexican television series endings
Spanish-language telenovelas
Television shows set in Mexico
Televisa telenovelas